Bradford John Faxon Jr. (born August 1, 1961) is an American professional golfer. He has won eight times on the PGA Tour.

Early years and amateur career
Faxon was born in Oceanport, New Jersey and raised in Barrington, Rhode Island. He attended Furman University, and earned a Bachelor of Economics degree in 1983.

At Furman, Faxon was a two-time All-American (1982, 1983) as a member of the golf team. He played on the 1983 Walker Cup team. Faxon won the Haskins Award for the most outstanding collegiate golfer in the United States in 1983. He also received that same year's Golf Magazine and NCAA Coaches Awards as the nation's outstanding amateur golfer. He turned professional in 1983.

Professional career

PGA Tour
Faxon has won eight times on the PGA Tour and played on two Ryder Cup teams. While admittedly not a great driver of the golf ball or a great ball-striker, Faxon has built a reputation as one of the best pure putters in golf history. He led the PGA Tour in Putting Average in 1996, 1999, and 2000 (when he set the single-season record with only 1.704 putts/greens in regulation), and finished 13th in 2005 at the age of 44. Faxon explains his success on the greens thus: "My only secret is confidence... I just try to hit every putt as if I've just made a million in a row."

Faxon had been one of the most successful players on the PGA Tour throughout the 1990s, a mainstay in the top 20 of the Official World Golf Rankings, but a knee injury began to hamper his effectiveness in 2003, causing him to suffer through his worst season in 14 years in 2004. Faxon bounced back in 2005, though, winning his first tournament in four years and finishing 45th on the PGA Tour Money List. On September 19, 2005, he underwent surgery to repair torn ligaments in his right knee. Faxon returned to competition for the 2006 season, in which he earned over $500,000.

In addition to his success on the PGA Tour Faxon played quite well on the Australasian Tour. He won the 1993 Australian Open, finished second in the 1993 Air New Zealand Shell Open, and finished in third place at the 1995 Greg Norman Holden International.

Champions Tour
Faxon made his Champions Tour debut at the 2011 3M Championship, where he finished T-31. He won his first title in October at the Insperity Championship.

Other projects

Charitable work
In addition to being one of the PGA Tour's top players over the past 25 years, Faxon is one of the game's most generous figures. In 1991, Faxon along with fellow Tour pro Billy Andrade, formed Billy Andrade/Brad Faxon Charities for Children, Inc., a non-profit organization that (as of 2005) has donated over $3 million to needy children in Rhode Island and southern Massachusetts. For their charity work, Faxon and Andrade were awarded the 1999 Golf Writers Association of America's Charlie Bartlett Award, given to professional golfers for unselfish contributions to society. Since 1999, Andrade and Faxon have also served as hosts of the CVS Charity Classic, a golf tournament held at the Rhode Island Country Club each June, whose proceeds benefit the two players' charity. He also co-chair's Button Hole with Andrade, a short course that serves as a teaching and learning center for children. Faxon also runs his own junior golf foundation.

Broadcasting
In 2010, Faxon worked for NBC as an analyst on golf broadcasts during the season. It was announced in July 2014 that Faxon would be joining Fox in 2015 as an on-air commentator along with David Fay.

Fight for Furman golf
In 2014, Furman University announced the school was going to discontinue the golf program. Faxon helped lead an alumni drive to save the program.

Personal
Faxon resides in Barrington, Rhode Island with his wife, Dory, and their four daughters.

Amateur wins
1975 Rhode Island Junior
1979 Rhode Island Amateur
1980 New England Amateur, Rhode Island Amateur
1981 New England Amateur
1982 Sunnehanna Amateur

Professional wins (21)

PGA Tour wins (8)

PGA Tour playoff record (3–6)

PGA Tour of Australasia wins (1)

PGA Tour satellite wins (1)

Other wins (9)

Other playoff record (2–3)

Champions Tour wins (2)

*Note: The 2011 Insperity Championship was shortened to 36 holes due to rain.

Results in major championships

LA = Low Amateur
CUT = missed the half-way cut
"T" indicates a tie for a place

Summary

Most consecutive cuts made – 13 (1993 PGA – 1996 PGA)
Longest streak of top-10s – 1 (four times)

Results in The Players Championship

CUT = missed the halfway cut
DQ = disqualified
"T" indicates a tie for a place

Results in World Golf Championships

1Cancelled due to 9/11

QF, R16, R32, R64 = Round in which player lost in match play
"T" = Tied
NT = No tournament

U.S. national team appearances
Amateur
Walker Cup: 1983 (winners)

Professional
Ryder Cup: 1995, 1997
Dunhill Cup: 1997
UBS Cup: 2003 (tie)

See also
1983 PGA Tour Qualifying School graduates

References

External links

American male golfers
Furman Paladins men's golfers
PGA Tour golfers
PGA Tour Champions golfers
Ryder Cup competitors for the United States
Golf writers and broadcasters
Golfers from New Jersey
Golfers from Rhode Island
People from Oceanport, New Jersey
People from Barrington, Rhode Island
1961 births
Living people